The 2007–08 Four Hills Tournament was held in only three of the traditional venues of Oberstdorf, Garmisch-Partenkirchen and Bischofshofen, located in Germany and Austria. The competition at Innsbruck was cancelled due to adverse weather conditions and replaced by an additional visit to Bischofshofen.

Finland's Janne Ahonen won his record fifth overall title after winning the last two events at Bischofshofen, and finishing on the podium in the two others. Overall World Cup leader Thomas Morgenstern of Austria finished second overall, and also claimed the individual win at Oberstdorf. The event at Garmish-Partenkirchen was won by Austrian Gregor Schlierenzauer, who finished 12th overall (he was third overall after three events, but dropped in the standings when he was knocked out in the first round of the last competition).

Overall standings

Oberstdorf
 HS137 Schattenbergschanze, Germany
December 30, 2007

Garmisch-Partenkirchen
 HS140 Große Olympiaschanze, Germany
January 1, 2008

Bischofshofen (originally scheduled for Innsbruck)
 HS140 Paul-Ausserleitner-Schanze, Austria
January 5, 2008

Bischofshofen

 HS140 Paul-Ausserleitner-Schanze, Austria
January 6, 2008

Janne Ahonen secured his record fifth overall Four Hills title ahead of Thomas Morgenstern, in an event where many of the other top-ranked jumpers (Schlierenzauer, Ammann, Hilde, Loitzl) were knocked out in the first round due to unfavorable wind conditions.

See also
2007–08 Ski Jumping World Cup

Four Hills Tournament, 2007-08
Four Hills Tournament, 2007-08
Four Hills Tournament
2007 in German sport
2008 in German sport
2008 in Austrian sport